Raman Kirenkin (born 20 February 1981) is a Russian-born Belarusian football coach and former player and Belarus international.

Honours
Dinamo Minsk
Belarusian Cup winner: 2002–03

References

External links
 
 

1981 births
Living people
Belarusian footballers
Association football defenders
Belarusian expatriate footballers
Belarus international footballers
Belarus under-21 international footballers
Expatriate footballers in China
Expatriate footballers in Ukraine
Belarusian expatriate sportspeople in China
FC Metalist-2 Kharkiv players
FC Dnepr Mogilev players
FC Dinamo Minsk players
FC Naftan Novopolotsk players
FC Gomel players
FC Torpedo-BelAZ Zhodino players
Liaoning F.C. players
Chinese Super League players
Belarusian Premier League players
FC Shakhtyor Soligorsk players
Belarusian football managers